Ännu doftar kärlek is a 1985 Curt Haagers studio album. It peaked at No. 36 in the Swedish albums chart.

Track listing
Ännu doftar kärlek
Barndomstiden (Han har öppnat pärleporten)
Romance de amor (Du är den ende)
Krasch bang bom och pang
Med dej i mina armar
Hör min sång Violetta (Violetta, based on a Giuseppe Verdi theme) 
Hon tror på mej (She Believes in Me)
Sista dansen (Love is in Your Eyes)
Här är vi (Live is Life)
La novia (bröllopet)
Det bor en ängel i dej
Om du vill (Young and Beautiful)
Du och jag (Au revoir madeleine)
Der rattenfänger (köp ringar)

Charts

References 

1985 albums
Curt Haagers albums